Hervé Hagard (born 9 November 1971) is a French former professional footballer who played as a defensive midfielder.

External links
 

1971 births
Living people
French footballers
Association football midfielders
AS Beauvais Oise players
Wasquehal Football players
Racing Club de France Football players
Ligue 2 players
SC Abbeville players
People from Péronne, Somme
Sportspeople from Somme (department)
Footballers from Hauts-de-France